Muay Thai at the 2007 Southeast Asian Games was held in the Gymnasium 1, Municipality Nakhon Ratchasima Sport Complex, Nakhon Ratchasima, Thailand.

Medal tally

Medalists

Men

Women

External links
Southeast Asian Games Official Results

2007 Southeast Asian Games events
2007